The pre-season of the 2022–23 NBL season, the 45th season of Australia's National Basketball League, ran from 9 August 2022 to 6 October 2022. The pre-season also featured the Adelaide 36ers to play games between two NBA teams, this will be the fourth NBLxNBA tour.

On 2 October 2022, the 36ers became the first NBL team to beat an NBA team when they defeated the Phoenix Suns.

Pre-season games

NBL Blitz 
The 2022 NBL Blitz is an annual pre-season tournament featuring all NBL teams. This season games were held in Darwin, Northern Territory from the 16th to the 23rd of September 2022.

Blitz ladder

Awards 
 Loggins-Bruton Cup: Adelaide 36ers
 Most Valuable Player (Ray Borner Medal): Jack McVeigh (Tasmania JackJumpers)

References

External links 

 Official Website

Pre-season
Sport in Darwin, Northern Territory